NGC 482 is a spiral galaxy in the constellation Phoenix. It is located approximately 277 million light-years from Earth and was discovered on October 23, 1835 by astronomer John Herschel.

See also  
 Spiral galaxy 
 List of NGC objects (1–1000)

References

External links 
  
 SEDS

Spiral galaxies
Phoenix (constellation)
0482
4823
Astronomical objects discovered in 1835
Discoveries by John Herschel